Hidden Ridge Station is a DART Light Rail station located in the Las Colinas development of Irving, Texas, for service on the . The station is located on Meadow Creek Drive, west of the Orange Line's grade crossing on Green Park Drive. Originally named Las Colinas Carpenter Ranch, it was originally planned to open in December 2012 to serve the surrounding neighborhood of Las Colinas. In April 2010, the station's construction and opening was deferred until further development justified a station.

The construction of a $1 billion office, residential, and entertainment development spearheaded by Verizon Wireless, which has an office campus across the street, prompted DART to resume plans for the station's construction. On April 24, 2019, DART announced that its board had officially approved the renaming of Carpenter Ranch Station to Hidden Ridge Station to tie in with the adjacent project. Construction was set to begin in mid 2020, with revenue service planned to begin in early 2021. The station began service on April 12, 2021.

References

External links 
Dallas Area Rapid Transit

Dallas Area Rapid Transit light rail stations
Unbuilt buildings and structures in the United States
Railway stations in the United States opened in 2021
Transportation in Irving, Texas